Giovanni Vespucci (1484after 1524), also known as Juan Vespucio or Vespucci, was an Italo-Spanish geographer, cartographer, and cosmographer. He was born in Florence around 1484. With his uncle Amerigo, he moved to Seville in Castile, Spain, where he was employed as a cartographer and cosmographer. In 1524, he was called upon as an expert to attend a board meeting between representatives of Spain and Portugal at the Old Town Hall in Badajoz to clarify the status of their territorial arrangements, attended by the likes of Hernando Colón, Sebastián Caboto, Juan Sebastián Elcano, Diego Ribeiro, and Esteban Gómez.

References

Citations

Bibliography

Spanish geographers
15th-century Italian cartographers
Spanish cartographers
15th-century people of the Republic of Florence
16th-century Spanish people
People from Seville